Hendrick Hudson High School is a public high school in Montrose, New York, United States. It draws its students from the neighboring hamlets of Verplanck, Cortlandt Manor, Crugers, the villages of Croton-on-Hudson and Buchanan, and the city of Peekskill.

There are approximately 900 students in Hendrick Hudson, averaging about 225 students per grade.

Administration
The principal of Hendrick Hudson is James L. Mackin, Jr. The assistant principals are Anthony Giovinazzi and Nick Katsaris.

Academics
In the 2007–2008 school year, Hendrick Hudson High School offered 50 sections of 12 Advanced Placement courses in eight different subject areas. It also began offering a three-year science research course sequence to tenth graders through the State University of New York at Albany in the High School program. There are two college level language classes offered through Syracuse University Project Advance (SUPA), in Italian and French.

In 2010, Hendrick Hudson High School introduced a new four-year engineering program through Project Lead the Way (PLTW). Since the 2011–2012 school year, a second four-year Project Lead the Way program has been offered in the biomedical sciences.

Arts

Chorus 
The choral program comprises three choruses: Concert Choir, an SATB group open to all Hen Hud students; Hen Hud Harmonizers, an audition-based SATB group; and a Treble Chorus, also known as the Treble Makers, an audition-based women's treble chorus. The Treble Makers won Best Overall Choir and Best Women's Chorus at the Music in the Parks festival in May 2007, 2008, 2009, 2010, 2011, and 2015. The Treble Chorus was invited to sing at the celebration in May 2009 commemorating the Aaron Copland House (which is located within the Hen Hud district) as a National Historic Landmark. The Treble Makers have recently been collaborating with British rock violinist Daisy Jopling, having performed with her and her band at the Paramount Center for the Arts in Peekskill, New York, as well as the Peter Norton Symphony Space in Manhattan.

At the 2010 NYSSMA Majors Festival, both the Treble Chorus and the Concert Choir (a select SATB group) achieved Gold with Distinction ratings on their performances.

Drama 
The Hendrick Hudson Starboard Stars Drama Club, in 2010, was nominated for six Metro Awards, and won for Outstanding Orchestra.

Band 
In 2005, 2007, and 2009 the Hendrick Hudson Wind Ensemble scored a Gold Rating in the annual NYSSMA majors festival under the direction of Joe Stamboni.

Sports
In 2006, the Hendrick Hudson Varsity volleyball team won the Class A New York State championship. The team won the 2007 and 2008 Class B state championships. In 2009, the volleyball team went to the State Tournament for the fifth consecutive year, and lost in the finals.

Honors and awards

The choral department has sent student musicians to the NYSSMA All-State Convention in Rochester, New York, where they have participated in either the Mixed or Women's Chorus. In 2009, three students were selected; in 2010, one student; and in 2011, three students. All were members of the award-winning Treble Makers.

The Hendrick Hudson Speech and Debate team hosts the annual Malcolm A. Bump Memorial Tournament, one of the largest debate tournaments in New York state. In 2005, the team was rated 13th overall in the country.

Notable alumni

 Ali Benjamin - author 
Evan Handler - actor 
Tiffany D. Jackson - author
 Andrew Jenks (2004) - movie producer and director
 Katie Jacobs Stanton (1987) - the CMO of Color Genomics and former Head of International Strategy at Twitter; Forbes #60 most powerful woman in the world 
 Cynthia Wade - 2008 Oscar winner
 Marc Meyers - writer, director and producer

References

External links
Hendrick Hudson High School official website

Public high schools in Westchester County, New York